Nathan David Saatchi (24 December 1907 – 31 May 2000) was born into a middle-class Jewish family in Iraq, then part of the Ottoman Empire. The name "Saatchi" (sā'ātchi), which means "watchmaker", originates from Ottoman Turkish (Saat: Originally from Arabic, -çi: Turkish suffix meaning maker in context).  He was a businessman and textile merchant who moved from Baghdad to London.

In 1936, he married Daisy Ezair, and they had four sons, including Maurice Saatchi and Charles Saatchi.

He died on 31 May 2000 and is buried at Golders Green Jewish Cemetery.

References

1907 births
2000 deaths
20th-century British businesspeople
Burials at Golders Green Jewish Cemetery
20th-century Iraqi businesspeople
Iraqi emigrants to the United Kingdom
Iraqi Jews
Naturalised citizens of the United Kingdom
People from Baghdad
Nathan